Zeynel is a Turkish given name. Notable people with the name include:

 Zeynel Abidin Erdem, Turkish  business tycoon
 Zeynel A. Karcioglu, Turkish scientist
 Zeynel Mungan, Turkish scientist
 Zeynelabidin Zinar, Kurdish writer and researcher

See also
 Zain
 El
 Abidin
 Zainal (disambiguation)
 Zainal Abidin (disambiguation)

Turkish masculine given names